The 2016–17 Campeonato de Portugal (also known as Campeonato de Portugal Prio, for sponsorship reasons) was the fourth season of Portuguese football's renovated third-tier league, since the merging of the Segunda Divisão and Terceira Divisão in 2013, and the second season under the current Campeonato de Portugal title. A total of 80 teams compete in this division, which began on 20 August 2016 and ended on 18 June 2017.

Format
The competition format consists of two stages. In the first stage, the 80 clubs were divided in eight series of 10 teams, according to geographic criteria. The only exceptions were teams from Madeira, which were placed in the first series, and teams from the Azores, which were distributed through the latter series. In each series, teams play against each other in a home-and-away double round-robin system.

In the second stage, the two best-placed teams from each first-stage series were divided in two groups of eight teams, again according to geographic proximity, with home-and-away matches. The two group winners secured promotion to the LigaPro. To determine the overall division champion, the group winners contested a one-off grand final on a neutral ground.

On 15 March 2016, the LPFP announced that four teams (instead of three) would be relegated to the 2017–18 Campeonato de Portugal, and two teams (instead of three) would be promoted directly from the Campeonato de Portugal to reduce the number of LigaPro teams to 20 for the 2017–18 season. There would also be a two-legged promotion/relegation play-off involving the 17th- and 18th-placed teams of 2016–17 LigaPro and both second-placed teams of the Campeonato de Portugal promotion groups (North and South).

The remaining eight clubs from each first-stage series were divided into eight groups of eight teams, with home-and-away matches, but there was a reshuffle so that teams from Series A, C, E and G ending the first stage from seventh to tenth were placed in the second stage's Series B, D, F and H and vice versa. Each teams only conserved 25% of first-stage points. The bottom-two teams from each group were relegated to the District Championships. The sixth-placed teams were paired into four two-legged play-out ties, with the four winners being paired into two further two-legged play-out ties. All six play-out losers were also relegated.

Teams
Relegated from the 2015–16 LigaPro:
 Farense
 Mafra
 Atlético CP
 Oriental
 Oliveirense

From the 2015–16 Campeonato de Portugal:

 Bragança
 Vilaverdense
 Marítimo B
 Pedras Salgadas
 Mirandela
 Limianos
 Camacha
 AD Oliveirense
 Torcatense
 São Martinho
 Felgueiras 1932
 Trofense
 Gondomar
 Pedras Rubras
 Salgueiros
 Sousense
 Cinfães
 Amarante
 Coimbrões
 Estarreja
 Anadia
 Sanjoanense
 Cesarense
 Lusitano de Vildemoinhos
 Mortágua
 Gafanha
 Praiense
 Angrense
 Operário
 Sporting Ideal
 Académica – SF
 Pampilhosa
 Tourizense
 AD Nogueirense
 Benfica e Castelo Branco
 União de Leiria
 Alcanenense
 Caldas
 Vitória de Sernache
 Sertanense
 Naval 1º de Maio
 Casa Pia
 1.º Dezembro
 Sintrense
 Atlético da Malveira
 Loures
 Real
 Torreense
 Sacavenense
 Moura
 Almancilense
 Barreirense
 Lusitano VRSA
 Pinhalnovense
 Louletano

Promoted from the 2015–16 District Championships:

 Algarve FA: Armacenenses
 Aveiro FA: Recreio de Águeda
 Beja FA: Mineiro Aljustrelense
 Braga FA: Merelinense
 Bragança FA: Torre de Moncorvo (Águia de Vimioso declined the promotion)
 Castelo Branco FA: Oleiros (Sporting da Covilhã B declined the promotion)
 Coimbra FA: Carapinheirense
 Évora FA: Sporting de Viana do Alentejo
 Guarda FA: Gouveia
 Leiria FA: Ginásio de Alcobaça
 Lisboa FA: Vilafranquense
 Madeira FA: Caniçal
 Portalegre FA: Gafetense (Mosteirense declined the promotion)
 Porto FA: Aliança de Gandra
 Santarém FA: Fátima
 Setúbal FA: Fabril do Barreiro
 Viana do Castelo FA: Ponte da Barca
 Vila Real FA: Montalegre
 Viseu FA: Moimenta da Beira
 Azores League: Lusitânia

First stage

Serie A

Serie B

Serie C

Serie D

Serie E

Serie F

Serie G

Serie H

Second stage

Promotion groups

North zone

South zone

Promotion play-off

Final

Relegation groups

Serie A

Serie B

Serie C

Serie D

Serie E

Serie F

Serie G

Serie H

Relegation play-out

First round

Carapinheirense lost 2–0 on aggregate and were relegated.

Angrense lost 3–2 on aggregate and were relegated.

Mineiro Aljustrelense lost 2–1 on aggregate and were relegated.

Atlético CP lost 1–0 on aggregate and were relegated.

Second round

2–2 on aggregate. Tourizense lost 5–4 on penalties and were relegated.

Gouveia lost 6–2 on aggregate and were relegated.

References

Campeonato Nacional de Seniores seasons
3
Por